Łukasz Kubot and David Marrero were the defending champions, but chose not to compete together.  Kubot played alongside Robert Lindstedt, but lost to Feliciano López and Max Mirnyi in the quarterfinals. Marrero teamed up with Ivo Karlović, but lost to López and Mirnyi in the first round. 
Kevin Anderson and Matthew Ebden won the title, defeating López and Mirnyi in the final, 6-3, 6-3.

Seeds

  Łukasz Kubot /  Robert Lindstedt (quarterfinals)
  Jean-Julien Rojer /  Horia Tecău (first round)
  Treat Huey /  Dominic Inglot (semifinals)
  Eric Butorac /  Raven Klaasen (quarterfinals)

Draw

Draw

Qualifying

Seeds

  Daniel Kosakowski /  Nicolas Meister (qualifying competition)
  Adrian Mannarino /  Stéphane Robert (qualified)

Qualifiers
  Adrian Mannarino /  Stéphane Robert

Qualifying draw

References
 Main Draw

2014 Abierto Mexicano Telcel